Đorđe Stojaković (1810–1863) was a Serbian political activist, lawyer and a revolutionary . He took an active role in the 1848 Revolutions which resulted in the creation of Serbian Vojvodina and Voivodeship of Serbia and Banat of Temeschwar. He was also a member of Matica Srpska.

1810 births
1863 deaths
19th-century Serbian people
History of Bačka
People of Serbian Vojvodina
People of the Revolutions of 1848
Serbian revolutionaries